Sahitya Akademi Translation Prizes are given each year to writers for their outstanding translations work in the 24 languages, since 1989.

Recipients  
Following is the list of recipients of Sahitya Akademi translation prizes for their works written in Assamese. The award, as of 2019, consisted of 50,000.

See also 
 List of Sahitya Akademi Award winners for Assamese

References 

Assamese
Indian literary awards
Literary awards by language